The Immortality Drive is a large memory device which was taken to the International Space Station in a Soyuz spacecraft on October 12, 2008. The Immortality Drive contains fully digitized DNA sequences of a select group of humans, such as physicist Stephen Hawking, comedian and talk show host Stephen Colbert, Playboy model Jo Garcia, game designer Richard Garriott, fantasy authors Tracy Hickman and Laura Hickman, pro wrestler Matt Morgan, and athlete Lance Armstrong. The microchip also contains a copy of George's Secret Key to the Universe, a 2007 children's book authored by Stephen Hawking and his daughter, Lucy.

The intent of the Immortality Drive is to preserve human DNA in a time capsule, in case some global cataclysm should occur on Earth.

The Immortality Drive   was featured in History Channel's Life After People, first-season episode "The Bodies Left Behind".

See also 

 List of time capsules

References 

International Space Station
time capsules